Hebius clerki the Yunnan keelback, is a species of snake of the family Colubridae. The snake is found in India, Myanmar, China, and Nepal.

References 

clerki
Reptiles of India
Reptiles of Myanmar
Reptiles of China
Reptiles of Nepal
Reptiles described in 1925
Taxa named by Frank Wall